Nikita Kashirsky (born 25 January 1985) is a retired Russian professional ice hockey forward.

Playing career
Kashirsky spent four seasons at Norwich University in the ECAC East before turning pro at the conclusion of his senior year with the ECHL's South Carolina Stingrays, scoring 18 points in 21 post-season games as a rookie as the Stingrays were crowned Kelly Cup Champions. He also had spells in the American Hockey League's Springfield Falcons, Manitoba Moose and Hershey Bears.  He signed with the Gwinnett Gladiators on September 28, 2011.

On August 25, 2012, Kashirsky signed with HC Spartak Moscow of the Kontinental Hockey League but was released from his contract a short time later. On December 27, 2013 Kashirsky returned to ECHL signing with Reading Royals, helping the franchise claim their first and his second Kelly Cup.

On August 6, 2013, Kashirsky left the Royals and returned abroad to the United Kingdom, signing a one-year contract as well as accepting an assistant coaching role within the Dundee Stars of the Elite Ice Hockey League. During the 2013–14 season, Kashirsky placed third in team scoring and helped the Stars claim the Gardner Conference Championship.

After a single season with the Stars, Kashirsky made a return to North America in agreeing to a one-year contract with the Wichita Thunder of the ECHL on July 9, 2014. In the 2014–15 season, Kashirsky appeared in 64 games for the Thunder to record 39 points.

On August 4, 2015, Kashirsky signed a contract with fellow ECHL competitors, the Greenville Road Warriors (later renamed the Swamp Rabbits), as a free agent. In the 2015–16 season, Kashirsky added 2 assists in 5 games as an alternate captain before he was waived by the Swamp Rabbits to make way for the Jordan Knackstedt signing on November 4, 2015. On November 11, 2015, Kashirsky joined his fifth ECHL club in signing a contract with the Fort Wayne Komets. Kashirsky was immediately placed into an offensive role with the Komets and in 31 games contributed with 19 points. On February 5, 2016, Kashirsky was again on the move as he was traded to return for a second stint the Reading Royals.

Career statistics

References

External links

1985 births
Living people
Dundee Stars players
Fort Wayne Komets players
Greenville Swamp Rabbits players
Gwinnett Gladiators players
Hershey Bears players
Manitoba Moose players
Norwich Cadets men's ice hockey players
Reading Royals players
Russian ice hockey forwards
South Carolina Stingrays players
Springfield Falcons players
HC Spartak Moscow players
Wichita Thunder players
Ice hockey people from Moscow
Russian expatriate sportspeople in the United States
Russian expatriate ice hockey people
Expatriate ice hockey players in the United States
Expatriate ice hockey players in Scotland
Expatriate ice hockey players in Canada
Russian expatriate sportspeople in Canada
Russian expatriate sportspeople in Scotland